Jozef Massy (20 August 1914 – 28 February 2011) was a Belgian sprint canoer who competed in the late 1940s. He finished eighth in the K-2 10000 m event at the 1948 Summer Olympics in London. He was born in Sint-Niklaas, Oost-Vlaanderen, Belgium and died in Duffel, Antwerp, Belgium.

References
Jozef Massy's profile at Sports Reference.com

1914 births
2011 deaths
Belgian male canoeists
Canoeists at the 1948 Summer Olympics
Olympic canoeists of Belgium
Sportspeople from Sint-Niklaas